Domenico Campanella, O. Carm. (24 September 1581 – 10 January 1663) was a Roman Catholic prelate who served as Bishop of Sant'Agata de' Goti (1654–1663).

Biography
Domenico Campanella was born in Putigliano, Italy and ordained a priest in the Order of the Brothers of the Blessed Virgin Mary of Mount Carmel.
On 12 January 1654, he was appointed during the papacy of Pope Innocent X as Bishop of Sant'Agata de' Goti.
On 18 January 1654, he was consecrated bishop by Giovanni Battista Maria Pallotta, Cardinal-Priest of San Pietro in Vincoli, with Patrizio Donati, Bishop Emeritus of Minori, and Giuseppe Ciantes, Bishop of Marsico Nuovo, serving as co-consecrators. 
He served as Bishop of Sant'Agata de' Goti until his death on 10 January 1663 in Rome.

References

External links and additional sources
 (for Chronology of Bishops) 
 (for Chronology of Bishops) 

17th-century Italian Roman Catholic bishops
Bishops appointed by Pope Innocent X
1663 deaths
Carmelite bishops
1581 births